Roncalli Catholic High School is a private, Roman Catholic high school in Omaha, Nebraska, United States.  It is located in the Roman Catholic Archdiocese of Omaha.

History 
The school was formed by a merger of all-girls Notre Dame Academy with all-boys Rummel High School in 1974. It is named after Pope John XXIII, Angelo Giuseppe Roncalli.

Athletics 
Roncalli Catholic is a member of the Nebraska School Activities Association.  They have won the following NSAA State Championships:

 Boys' basketball – 1996

Notable people 
 Alec Bohm, 3rd overall pick in the 2018 Major League Baseball draft
 Tim Burke, former MLB player for the Montreal Expos, New York Mets, and New York Yankees
 Jim Skow, former NFL defensive end and 58th overall pick in the 1986 NFL Draft

References

External links 
 School website

Catholic secondary schools in Nebraska
Lasallian schools in the United States
High schools in Omaha, Nebraska
Roman Catholic Archdiocese of Omaha
Educational institutions established in 1974